Slave Women of Corinth (aka Aphrodite, Goddess of Love) is a 1958 Italian epic historical drama film written and directed by Mario Bonnard.

Plot 
Antigonus, archon of Corinth, wants to build a magnificent temple dedicated to the goddess Aphrodite, for which the people are  oppressed by new and very high taxes. The sculptor Demetrius, asked to make the face of the goddess Diana, falls in love with a slave, the Christian Lerna.  With the arrival of the plague the people are increasingly discontented and Antigonus has easy game accusing the Christians who are immediately arrested and sentenced to death. The Roman troops arrive to restore order, saving the two lovers Demetrius and Lerna.

Cast 

 Isabelle Corey: Lerna 
 Anthony Steffen: Demetrius (credited as Antonio De Teffe) 
 Irène Tunc: Diala 
 Clara Calamai: Stenele 
 John Kitzmiller: Tomoro 
 Ivo Garrani: Antigonus
 Massimo Serato: Quinto Rufo 
 Giulio Donnini: Erasto 
 Carlo Tamberlani: Matteo 
 Gianpaolo Rosmino: Dineo (credited as Giampaolo Rosmino) 
 Andrea Aureli: Kibur 
 Matteo Spinola: Glauco 
 Adriano Micantoni: Ftire 
 Mino Doro: Crepilo 
 Germano Longo: Osco 
 Paul Muller: L'Asiatico (credited as Paolo Muller) 
 Livio Lorenzon: La Spia (credited as Silvio Lorenzon) 
 Liliana Gerace: La Veggente  
 Emma Baron: Onoria

References

External links

1958 films
1958 drama films
Peplum films
Films directed by Mario Bonnard
Films with screenplays by Sergio Leone
Films set in the 1st century
Films set in the Roman Empire
Films set in ancient Greece
Films about fictional painters
Religious epic films
Films scored by Giovanni Fusco
Sword and sandal films
Italian historical drama films
1950s historical drama films
1950s Italian films